Ion Besoiu (11 March 1931 – 18 January 2017) was a Romanian actor.

Biography
He was born in Sibiu in 1931 and graduated the city's Theater and Music Academy. After making his debut in 1957, he played for 16 years at the Radu Stanca National Theatre in Sibiu. He then moved to Bucharest, where he played at the Bulandra Theatre. He later served for 12 years as director of this well-known theatre.

Besoiu appeared in some of the most important Romanian films from the Communist period: "Furtuna", "Neamul Șoimăreștilor", "Haiducii", "Răscoala", "Mihai Viteazul", "Ciprian Porumbescu", "Păcală", "Blestemul pământului, blestemul iubirii", "Ultima noapte de dragoste", "Lumini și umbre", "Ce neagră e mama", and "Toate pânzele sus!". 

He died at Fundeni Hospital in Bucharest in 2017; he is buried at the city's Bellu Cemetery.

He was also chosen by Disney to provide the Romanian voice of a character in the animated series – Darwing Duck.

Selected filmography
 Thirst (1961)
 Haiducii (1966)
 Michael the Brave (1970)
 The Actor and the Savages (1975)
 Toate pînzele sus (1976-1978), Anton Lupan
 Mihail, câine de circ (1979)
 The Last Assault (1985)
 The Silver Mask (1985) - Gheorghe Bibescu
 Lombarzilor 8 (2006) 
 Cu un pas inainte (2007), Tudor Avramescu
 Inimă de țigan (2007), Vasile Dumbravă
 Poveste de cartier (2008) - Nea' Petrică
 Regina (2009), Don Tito	
 Loverboy (2011)
 Pariu cu viața (2012) - Bubu's father
 Bucharest Non Stop (2015)

Awards

In 2001 he was awarded the Order of the Star of Romania, Knight rank, by President Ion Iliescu.
In 2001 he was declared Citizen of Honour of Sibiu.
In 2002 he received the Excellency Prize of Romanian Cinematography.
In 2011 he received the Gopo Prize for Lifetime Achievement.

References

External links

1931 births
2017 deaths
People from Sibiu
Romanian male stage actors
Romanian male film actors
Romanian male television actors
20th-century Romanian male actors
21st-century Romanian male actors
Knights of the Order of the Star of Romania
Burials at Bellu Cemetery